Whiz Kids is an album by vibraphonist Gary Burton's Quintet recorded in 1986 and released on the ECM label. Featuring Burton with longtime colleague Steve Swallow on bass guitar, and a new band consisting of tenor saxophonist  Tommy Smith, pianist Makoto Ozone and drummer Martin Richards.

Reception 
The Allmusic review by Scott Yanow awarded the album 4 stars stating "The repertoire (all obscurities) and post-bop solos have more fire than one would normally expect on a Gary Burton record, and there are plenty of colorful moments on this subtle but adventurous set".

Track listing 
All compositions by Makoto Ozone except as indicated
 "The Last Clown" (Tommy Smith) - 8:57 
 "Yellow Fever" - 6:53 
 "Soulful Bill" (James Williams) - 8:11 
 "La Divetta" - 8:34 
 "Cool Train" (Christian Jacob) - 6:46 
 "The Loop" (Chick Corea) - 8:10 
Recorded at Tonstudio Bauer in Ludwigsburg, West Germany in June 1986

Personnel 
  Gary Burton — vibraphone, marimba
 Makoto Ozone — piano
 Tommy Smith — tenor saxophone
 Steve Swallow — electric bass
 Martin Richards — drums

References 

ECM Records albums
Gary Burton albums
Albums produced by Manfred Eicher
1987 albums